Juliana Geran Pilon is a Romanian-born naturalized American writer. She is currently a senior fellow at the Alexander Hamilton Institute for the Study of Western Civilization in Clinton, New York. She previously was professor of politics and culture and director of the Center for Culture and Security at The Institute of World Politics.

Personal life and education
Born in Romania, Pilon emigrated with her family to the United States as a teenager. She attended the University of Chicago under a scholarship and graduated with a B.A. in philosophy in 1969. She attended Princeton University for a year between 1969 and 1970, where she studied history and philosophy, but returned to the University of Chicago where she earned an M.A. in philosophy in 1971 and a Ph.D. in philosophy in 1974. She is married to Roger Pilon.

Career
Pilon served as an assistant professor in the department of philosophy at Emory University in Atlanta from 1977 to 1979. In 1979, she relocated to Stanford University, where she was a visiting scholar at the Hoover Institution. The following year, she held a fellowship at the Institute for Humane Studies in Menlo Park, California. From 1981 to 1988, Pilon was a Senior Policy Analyst at The Heritage Foundation in Washington, D.C. From 1992 to 2002, she joined the International Foundation for Election Systems, serving as director of programs for Europe and Asia, then vice president for programs, and as senior advisor for civil society. In August 2002, she became associate director of the Center for Democracy and Election Management at American University, serving in that capacity until February 2003.

Pilon was an adjunct professor at Johns Hopkins University, American University, and George Washington University, a visiting professor at St. Mary's College of Maryland, and an adjunct professor at Rochester Institute of Technology, as well as the National Defense University. She is currently a senior fellow at the Alexander Hamilton Institute for the Study of Western Civilization.

Publications
She has written several books and monographs, according to her résumé, and over two hundred fifty published articles and reviews for The Wall Street Journal, The American Spectator, National Review, The National Interest, Humanitas, and other publications.

Books
 ]
 ]
 Notes from the other side of night (Routledge, 2016) [https://www.amazon.com/Notes-Other-Night-Juliana-Geran/dp/1412852609}
 
 
 
  (with Richard W. Soudriette)
 
  (with Ralph Kinney Bennett)

References

External links
  Lecture on "The Art of Peace" at the Heritage Foundation, Nov. 14, 2016 
 

American political writers
The Heritage Foundation
University of Chicago alumni
Indiana University faculty
Johns Hopkins University faculty
George Washington University faculty
St. Mary's College of Maryland faculty
American people of Romanian-Jewish descent
Romanian emigrants to the United States
Roosevelt University faculty
Living people
Year of birth missing (living people)
The Institute of World Politics faculty